The 2019 Canadian Premier League Finals determined the winner of the Canadian Premier League's inaugural 2019 season. It featured Cavalry FC of Calgary, Alberta, and Forge FC of Hamilton, Ontario, and was the culmination of a rivalry that had developed between those teams.

It was contested over two legs between the winners of the spring and fall seasons, with the fall season winners choosing which leg to host. Since Cavalry won both split seasons, the team with the second-best overall season record, Forge, also competed in the Championship.

Forge won the inaugural Canadian Premier League title 2–0 on aggregate following a pair of 1–0 victories. This earned the club the right to compete in the 2020 CONCACAF League where they ultimately reached the quarter-finals.

Path to the finals 

The 2019 Canadian Premier League season used a split season format where each team played 10 games in an opening spring season and 18 games in a closing fall season. At the end of the full season, the spring season winner would face the fall season winner in a two-legged tie for the league title. If one team won both the spring and the fall seasons, that team would face the team with the highest cumulative points total across both seasons for the title.

On June 26, 2019, Cavalry won the spring season and qualified for the championship. On September 28, 2019, Forge secured the second best overall season record, and thus clinched the second spot in the finals.

Spring season

Fall season

Overall table

Cavalry FC
Cavalry started the inaugural 2019 Canadian Premier League season as one of six newly-formed teams competing in the league. They started their spring campaign with a 2–1 win over York9 FC on May 4. They went on to win the first seven games of the ten game spring season before suffering a 1–0 to Forge FC. Their 2–0 victory in their next game against York9 on June 26 clinched the spring title and a berth in the Finals.

Cavalry finished the spring season with a 8–0–2 record. They also won the fall competition by one point with a 11–5–2 record, giving the Finals berth for that season to the second-placed overall record.

Forge FC
Forge was another one of the newly-formed teams for the inaugural season. They finished the spring season in second place with a 6–1–3 record. In the fall season, Cavalry and Forge cemented themselves as the top two teams in the standings. Forge was able to clinch the Finals berth after a 3–0 victory over Pacific FC on September 28, 2019.

Despite not clinching the fall title, Cavalry and Forge's dominance ensured that no other team could catch them in either the fall or overall standings. Forge would go on to finish second in the fall season by one point, winning the Finals berth not as the fall title winner but the second-placed overall finisher.

Head-to-head
Going into the Finals, Cavalry and Forge had played each other seven times in 2019; winning three matches each, with one draw, and scoring seven goals apiece. In June, Cavalry defeated Forge 3–2 on aggregate in the second qualifying round of the Canadian Championship.

In the final week of the regular season, Forge and Cavalry faced-off in Hamilton. With both teams having clinched their positions in the overall table, each side rested key players in advance of the Finals. Forge won the game 1–0 but defender Dominic Samuel picked up two yellow cards and was automatically suspended for the first leg of the Finals.

Venues

Forge's home of Tim Hortons Field in Hamilton, with a reduced seating capacity of 10,016 hosted the first leg. Opened in 2014, the multi-purpose stadium is shared with the Canadian Football League's Hamilton Tiger-Cats. The second leg was held in Cavalry's home of ATCO Field in Foothills County. It is a 5,288 capacity stadium part of the Spruce Meadows equestrian facility.

Match details

First leg

Summary
The first leg of the Finals was played on October 26 at Tim Hortons Field in Hamilton, Ontario. Forge FC entered the game without defenders Dominic Samuel and Bertrand Owundi who were serving suspensions. Forge had the first close chance when captain Kyle Bekker's long shot hit the crossbar in the 35th minute. Minutes later, Cavalry defender Joel Waterman handled the ball in his own penalty area while sliding to prevent a scoring chance. Waterman was sent off and Forge was awarded a penalty kick. CPL-leading scorer Tristan Borges took the penalty kick but it was stopped by Marco Carducci to keep the game scoreless. Late into first half stoppage time, Borges would beat Carducci with a left-footed strike to give Forge the lead going into halftime. Early in the second half, Forge controlled possession with the man-advantage. In the 69th minute, a challenge between Borges and Jay Wheeldon of Cavalry sent both players to the ground. As a result of the play, Borges was shown a red card and both teams finished the match with 10 players.

After the match, Cavalry and Forge appealed their respective red cards to the Canadian Soccer Association. The governing body's disciplinary committee upheld the red card to Cavalry's Joel Waterman for denying an obvious goal scoring opportunity, and confirmed he would be suspended for the second leg of the Finals. The red card and suspension to Tristan Borges was overturned, with the committee citing that his actions "did not meet the threshold of a violent conduct offence."

Details

Second leg

Broadcasting
First leg
OneSoccer
CBC Sports

Second leg
OneSoccer

See also 
2019 Canadian Championship Final
Cavalry FC–Forge FC rivalry

References

External links 

Finals
Canadian Premier League Finals
Canadian Premier League Finals
Sports competitions in Hamilton, Ontario
Sports competitions in Calgary